"Hell Is For Children" is a 1980 song by Pat Benatar from her album Crimes of Passion.

Hell Is For Children may also refer to:

Hell Is For Children, a song by Vesania from their album Distractive Killusions
Hell Is For Children, a cover of the Pat Benatar song by Viking from their 1989 album Man of Straw